Hacılar is a village in the Hassa District, Hatay Province, Turkey. The village had a population of 495 in 2022.

In late 19th century, German orientalist Martin Hartmann listed the village as a settlement of 8 houses inhabited by Turks, 2 houses by Armenians, and 4 houses by Turkish-speaking Greeks.

References

Villages in Hassa District